Prince Johannes Mkolishi Dlamini (25 December 1928 - 23 December 1988), was the Chief of Embhuleni between September 1954 until his death at age 60 in December 1988. A grandson of Mswati II, Prince Mkolishi was officially installed by the South African government in December 1959 as the Chief of the Embhuleni Royal Kraal.

Chief Mkolishi Dlamini succeeded his father Prince Maquba as the Chief of the Embhuleni on 18 September 1953

During the 1970s, Chief Mkolishi led the struggle for the incorporation of the KaNgwane Bantustan into eSwatini under King Sobhuza II and was opposed to the arrangements of the Bantustan as it left Embhuleni out of eSwatini. He founded the Inyandza National Movement which advocated for the interest of Swati people during the KaNgwane regime

Early life and Career
Prince Mkolishi Dlamini was born in Badplaas at the Dlomodlomo Mountains on 25 December 1928. He was the son of the late Chief of Embhuleni, Prince James Maquba Dlamini, and his wife Mkhosise Madonsela. Maquba's father was King Mswati II.

Mkolishi received his primary and secondary school education in the Carolina and Ermelo districts (now Gert Sibande District).

While his royal parents installed him as the Chief of Embhuleni after Chief Maquba's death on 18 September 1954, he was only issued with a certificate of recognition by the Apartheid government in December 1959 and was instrumental in the leads-up to the establishment of homeland administration afterwards

He was elected the chairman of the Swazi Territorial Authority (that got to be named the KaNgwane government) when it was founded in 1976, and subsequently a member of the KaNgwane Legislative Assembly as well as Minister of Justice in the KaNgwane government.

Opposition to Bantustan
It is recorded that Prince Mkolishi and the late Enos Mabuza never saw eye to eye and which led to divisions amongst the members of the Swazi Territorial Authority just months after its formation. Chief Mkolishi influenced the naming of the Bantustan administration to KaNgwane, which literally means Place of the People of eSwatini.

Prince Mkolishi advocated for the fusion of the KaNgwane government to eSwatini and Mabuza opposed it, leading to squabbles amongst the Swati tribal leaders and administrators of the KaNgwane government who otherwise felt the order worked in the advantage of blacks in South Africa. He also protested the inclusion of people who were not Swati into the KaNgwane homeland and also fought successfully against the forced removal in 1984 of the Embhuleni villagers away from what was considered the land of white people

References

External references

History of EmaSwati in SA